Nardo Fotballklubb is a Norwegian football club from Trondheim. The men's team currently plays in the 3. divisjon, having been relegated from the 2. divisjon in 2021. The club played on the second tier from 1993 to 1996.

History
The club was formed on 14 January 1971 by a group of former Nidelv IL members. The club played its first season in the 6. divisjon (seventh tier) in 1972, and won promotion the next year. After two decades at amateur level, the club earned some success under coach Roar Stokke, and was promoted from the fourth tier to the second tier, where they were fighting for promotion to Tippeligaen, and achieved a fourth place in the 1993 1. divisjon. Stokke resigned from his position in September 1995 after disagreements with the board of directors. In 1996, the club was relegated from the 1. divisjon, and have since alternated between the 2. divisjon and the 3. divisjon. The club won promotion from the 3. divisjon in 2008, after beating Tiller 4-3 on aggregate in the promotion play-offs.

Current squad 

As of 14 July 2020.

Recent history 
{|class="wikitable"
|-bgcolor="#efefef"
! Season
! 
! Pos.
! Pl.
! W
! D
! L
! GS
! GA
! P
!Cup
!Notes
|-
|2006
|3. divisjon
|align=right bgcolor=#DDFFDD| 1
|align=right|22||align=right|18||align=right|1||align=right|3
|align=right|84||align=right|25||align=right|55
|First round
|Promoted to the 2. divisjon
|-
|2007
|2. divisjon
|align=right bgcolor="#FFCCCC"| 13
|align=right|26||align=right|5||align=right|5||align=right|16
|align=right|32||align=right|66||align=right|20
|First round
|Relegated to the 3. divisjon
|-
|2008
|3. divisjon
|align=right bgcolor=#DDFFDD| 1
|align=right|22||align=right|19||align=right|0||align=right|3
|align=right|85||align=right|30||align=right|57
||Second round
|Promoted to the 2. divisjon
|-
|2009
|2. divisjon
|align=right |8
|align=right|26||align=right|9||align=right|8||align=right|9
|align=right|37||align=right|38||align=right|35
||First round
|
|-
|2010
|2. divisjon
|align=right |6
|align=right|26||align=right|9||align=right|7||align=right|10
|align=right|44||align=right|46||align=right|34
||Second round
|
|-
|2011 
|2. divisjon
|align=right |11
|align=right|26||align=right|8||align=right|5||align=right|13
|align=right|43||align=right|55||align=right|29
||First round
|
|-
|2012
|2. divisjon
|align=right |2
|align=right|26||align=right|15||align=right|5||align=right|6
|align=right|58||align=right|42||align=right|50
||Second round
|
|-
|2013
|2. divisjon
|align=right |9
|align=right|26||align=right|8||align=right|8||align=right|10
|align=right|50||align=right|49||align=right|32
||First round
|
|-
|2014
|2. divisjon
|align=right |7
|align=right|26||align=right|10||align=right|8||align=right|8
|align=right|41||align=right|42||align=right|38
||First round
|
|-
|2015
|2. divisjon
|align=right |3
|align=right|26||align=right|12||align=right|5||align=right|9
|align=right|39||align=right|37||align=right|41
||First round
|
|-
|2016
|2. divisjon
|align=right |7
|align=right|26||align=right|11||align=right|6||align=right|9
|align=right|28||align=right|36||align=right|39
||Third round
|
|-
|2017 
|2. divisjon
|align=right |7
|align=right|26||align=right|12||align=right|4||align=right|10
|align=right|29||align=right|35||align=right|40
||First round
|
|-
|2018 
|2. divisjon
|align=right |10
|align=right|26||align=right|8||align=right|7||align=right|11
|align=right|33||align=right|44||align=right|31
||First round
|
|-
|2019 
|2. divisjon
|align=right |11
|align=right|26||align=right|8||align=right|5||align=right|13
|align=right|27||align=right|43||align=right|27
||Second round
|
|-
|2020
|2. divisjon
|align=right |10
|align=right|13||align=right|2||align=right|6||align=right|5
|align=right|12||align=right|20||align=right|12
||Cancelled
|
|-
|2021
|2. divisjon
|align=right bgcolor="#FFCCCC"| 13
|align=right|26||align=right|6||align=right|6||align=right|14
|align=right|31||align=right|55||align=right|24
||Fourth round
|Relegated to the 3. divisjon
|}
Source:

Records

Source:

References

External links
 Official site 
 Nissekollen Idrettspark - Nordic Stadiums

 
Sport in Trondheim
Association football clubs established in 1971
1971 establishments in Norway